Neomegalodon is an extinct genus of bivalve molluscs belonging to the family Megalodontidae.

Species
†Neomegalodon cornutus Yao et al. 2007
†Neomegalodon triqueter Wulfen 1793

Fossil record
Fossils of Neomegalodon have been found in the Triassic (age range: from 235.0 to 201.6 million years ago). They are known from various localities of Italy, Austria, China, Germany, Hungary, Tajikistan and United States.

References 

Prehistoric bivalve genera
Bivalve taxonomy